Muksar  is a village development committee in Siraha District in the Sagarmatha Zone of south-eastern Nepal. At the time of the 1991 Nepal census it had a population of 2974 people living in 538 individual households. it is pollution free village and there is Thakuri caste leaving.

References

External links
UN map of the municipalities of  Siraha District

Populated places in Siraha District